Rebecca Ann King (born April 14, 1950, in Hancock, Iowa) is most noted as holder of the 1974 Miss America title.

Life and career
King was crowned Miss Colorado 1973 and later earned the title of Miss America 1974. Heralding the arrival of feminism in this most traditional of events, Rebecca King was a law student, who famously expressed feminist political views at the Miss America Pageant's morning-after breakfast following her coronation. She pressured the Miss America Organization to award points for the interview section of the competition and has spoken in favor of female empowerment at many schools and organizations.

King received a law degree from the University of Denver School of Law and became a practicing domestic-relations attorney specializing in divorce.

Personal life
She married banker George Dreman in 1992 and has since used the name Rebecca King Dreman. They have 2 daughters, Emily and Diana. Her daughter, Diana, won the Miss Colorado 2011 pageant and competed at the Miss America 2012 pageant, making her the first daughter of a Miss America ever to compete for the Miss America title.    In September 2010, after she felt a marshmallow-like lump in her arm she was diagnosed with stage-4 melanoma.

References

1950 births
Living people
American feminists
American lawyers
American women lawyers
Miss America 1974 delegates
Miss America winners
People from Pottawattamie County, Iowa
Sturm College of Law alumni
21st-century American women